A town in the Republic of the Congo, Mbé is located in the Ngabe District of the Department of Pool, approximately 200 km northeast of Brazzaville.
A village in Cameroon, Adamoua region, Vina North

Site Description 
The royal domain of Mbé was composed of various sites related to the culture and the history of the Bateke people. The capital and residence of the Makoko (king) was also referred to as Mbé.

The Kingdom knew ceaseless displacements throughout its history. The precolonial Bateke cultural tradition, indeed, required the displacement of the capital “Mbé” whenever a king died suddenly.

World Heritage Status 
This site was added to the UNESCO World Heritage Tentative List on June 12, 2008, in the Cultural category.

Notable people 

 Ngalifourou, Queen Mother of the Teke and ally of the French colonisers.

References 

Populated places in the Republic of the Congo